Al-Turath University is a private Iraqi university and the oldest of such type in Iraq. Established in 1988 in the Mansour district of Baghdad, The name al-turath (التراث) means "heritage" or "tradition".

See also 
 Private universities in Iraq

External links
 https://turath.edu.iq/

Turath
Education in Baghdad
Educational institutions established in 1988
1988 establishments in Iraq